Adrian "Ace" Baldwin Jr. is an American college basketball player for the VCU Rams of the Atlantic 10 Conference.

Early life and high school
Baldwin Jr. grew up in Baltimore, Maryland and attended Saint Frances Academy. He was named the Metro Player of the Year after averaging 14 points, six assists, four rebounds, and four steals per game during his junior season. Baldwin repeated as the co-Player of the Year as a senior. He was rated a four-star recruit and committed to play college basketball at VCU over offers from Virginia, Villanova, Georgetown, Maryland, Kansas State, and Seton Hall.

College career
Baldwin started all 26 of the VCU Rams' games during his freshman season and averaged 6.7 points, 4.4 assists, and 3.2 rebounds per game. He suffered a ruptured achilles tendon in June of 2021 and missed the beginning of his sophomore season. Baldwin returned in December and was named second-team All-Atlantic 10 Conference after averaging 11.4 points, 5.5 assists, and 2.5 steals per game. He was named the Atlantic 10 Player of the Year as a junior.

References

External links
VCU Rams bio

Living people
American men's basketball players
Basketball players from Baltimore
VCU Rams men's basketball players
Shooting guards